The Truce is a 1974 Argentine romantic drama film directed by Sergio Renán and based on the 1960 novel of the same name by Mario Benedetti. It was the first Argentine film to be nominated for an Academy Award (the Academy Award for Best Foreign Language Film).

It was selected as the eighth greatest Argentine film of all time in a poll conducted by the Museo del Cine Pablo Ducrós Hicken in 1984, while it ranked 6th in the 2000 edition. In a new version of the survey organized in 2022 by the specialized magazines La vida util, Taipei and La tierra quema, presented at the Mar del Plata International Film Festival, the film reached the 27 position.

Plot
The film opens on Martín Santomé's (Héctor Alterio) 49th birthday, a widower and the father of three children: the eldest, the embittered Esteban (Luis Brandoni); the caring middle-child Blanca (Marilina Ross) and Jaime (Oscar Martínez), a closeted homosexual. He goes to work thinking they have forgotten his birthday, and once at the office, he assigns two new employees to their jobs: the effeminate, nervous Santini (Antonio Gasalla) and the young Laura (Ana María Picchio), with whom he soon develops a bond. Back home, Martín is surprised with a party thrown by his children.

After having a one-night stand with a woman he met on the bus (Norma Aleandro), Martín starts going through a series of events that alter his life completely. Santini has a nervous breakdown at work and rants against the complacency of his co-workers; he is subsequently replaced, though the breakdown marks Martín and forces him to look at his own life. His son Jaime finally comes out and decides to leave home to save the family from embarrassment and further complications. Topping it all, Martín, who has befriended Laura, professes his love for her at a café and implores her to look beyond the age difference (he is 49, she is 24) and give him a chance. She accepts.

The two start dating and Martín regains his wont of living. Their relationship never falters, and hints of infidelity are quickly dismissed. He moves into her apartment, forsaking his son and daughter (who starts dating a man herself). This upsets Esteban even more, who blames his father for giving him a mediocre life. Martín implores him that it is never late to change, and they reconcile.

The film's climax begins with the untimely demise of Laura, who contracts flu and dies from heart failure shortly thereafter. Martín once again regains his bleak view of life and the world. He realizes that his romance with Laura was nothing but "a truce with life". The film ends on an ambiguous tone, as Esteban tries to comfort his father, roles inverted, and the camera centers on Martín, leaning against the wall, looking more hopeless than ever.

Cast
Héctor Alterio ....  Martín Santomé
Luis Brandoni ....  Esteban Santomé
Ana María Picchio ....  Laura Avellaneda
Marilina Ross ....  Blanca Santomé
Oscar Martínez ....  Jaime Santomé
Cipe Lincovsky ....  Laura's mother
Lautaro Murúa .... The Manager
Norma Aleandro .... Woman on the bus
Sergio Renán ... Jaime's friend
Antonio Gasalla ....  Santini
Luis Politti .... Vignale
 Jorge Sassi .... Suárez

Background 
Argentine actor Sergio Renán had been performing in films since 1951 under the direction of noted filmmakers Mario Soffici, Lucas Demare and three times under Leopoldo Torre Nilsson. It was in his last collaboration with Torre Nilsson, in 1973, that he met fellow co-stars Héctor Alterio and Norma Aleandro. A year later he would cast them both in a starring role and a cameo appearance respectively in his film debut, La tregua.

A year after its release, La tregua was submitted to the Academy Awards (the Academy Award for Best Foreign Language Film) and won a nomination (the first Academy Award nomination in Argentine film history) but lost out to Federico Fellini's Amarcord.  The film has since gained cult status in Argentina. A Mexican remake was made in 2003.

See also
 List of submissions to the 47th Academy Awards for Best Foreign Language Film
 List of Argentine submissions for the Academy Award for Best Foreign Language Film

Notes

References 
 Schwartz, Ronald, Latin American Films, 1932 - 1994. McFarland. Jefferson, North Carolina.  1997.

External links

1974 films
1974 drama films
1970s Spanish-language films
Films directed by Sergio Renán
Films shot in Buenos Aires
Argentine drama films